"Your Used to Be" is a song written by Howard Greenfield and Jack Keller and performed by Brenda Lee.  The song reached #12 on the adult contemporary chart and #32 on the Billboard Hot 100 in 1963.  In Australia, the song also reached #19.

References

1963 songs
1963 singles
Songs with lyrics by Howard Greenfield
Songs written by Jack Keller (songwriter)
Brenda Lee songs
Decca Records singles